Daniel Bekele (Amharic: ዳንኤል በቀለ; 17 February 1967) is an Ethiopian lawyer and human rights activist. He was detained from November 2005 to March 2008 for his complaints about the procedures of the  2005 Ethiopian general election. He was executive director of the Africa division at Human Rights Watch from 2011 to 2016. In 2019, Daniel was appointed head of the Ethiopian Human Rights Commission.

Youth and education
He graduated in 1989 with a bachelor's degree in law and in 2001 with a master's degree in development studies from Addis Ababa University. He obtained a master's degree in law from Oxford University in 2003. He later started doctoral studies on a "Comparative Study of Media Law in East Africa" at Oxford.

Early career
Daniel was a legal advisor to Ethiopian Sugar Corporation during 1998–1990, and then became an independent legal consultant. He specialised in supporting civil society, human rights education, and promoted legal changes for improving the protections for women's rights. Daniel became a member of ActionAid in 2004, becoming responsible for policy research and advocacy. He held a senior position in United Insurance Company. Daniel was one of the leaders of the Ethiopian component of the Global Call to Action Against Poverty campaign.

2005–2008 detention
Daniel was one of the key civil society organisers coordinating monitoring of the 2005 Ethiopian general election. He criticised the procedures of how the election was held. On 16 October 2005, he was "badly beaten by unidentified armed men", which Amnesty International interpreted to be a result of his criticisms of the electoral procedures. Daniel was detained on 1 November 2005. In December 2007, he and Netsanet Demissie were convicted in the Ethiopian Federal High Court for "provoking and preparing 'outrages against the Constitution'" but acquitted of committing "outrages", by a majority of two judges out of three, after a two-year trial. Daniel and Netsanet were released on 28 March 2008. Amnesty International considered Daniel's and Netsanet's detention and conviction to have been only based on their human rights activities, and defined both as having been prisoners of conscience. Amnesty director for Africa, Erwin van der Borght, stated, "It is deplorable that civil society activists who are prisoners of conscience like Daniel Bekele and Netsanet Demissie can be arrested and unfairly convicted simply for peacefully conducting human rights work."

Human rights bodies
Daniel was executive director of the Africa division of Human Rights Watch (HRW) from 2011 to 2016, and later became its senior director for Africa advocacy.

In July 2019, Daniel was appointed as the new head of the Ethiopian Human Rights Commission (EHRC), selected from among 88 candidates by the House of People's Representatives (HoPR, the lower house of Ethiopian parliament) replacing Addisu Gebreegziabhier.

In September 2021, Daniel was awarded the 2021 German Africa Prize for his commitment to defending human rights and democracy.

Points of view
In 2012, Daniel criticised the United States and the European Union for supporting economic development in authoritarian countries while only "pay[ing] lip service" to human rights violations in those countries. He included Ethiopia as an example where development aid increased while human rights "severely deteriorated".

References

 
Ethiopian human rights activists
Amnesty International prisoners of conscience held by Ethiopia
1967 births
Living people